Reed Log House, also known as Macy Cabin, Prather House and Keller House , is a historic home located in the Ozark National Scenic Riverways near Eminence, Shannon County, Missouri.  It was built in 1857, with two additions dating from about 1885 and 1910.  It is a one-story, vernacular Ozark pine log structure with vertical board siding on a stone foundation. 

It was listed on the National Register of Historic Places in 1991.

References

Log buildings and structures on the National Register of Historic Places in Missouri
Houses completed in 1857
Buildings and structures in Shannon County, Missouri
National Register of Historic Places in Shannon County, Missouri